Groll is a surname. Notable people with the surname include:

Albert Lorey Groll (1866–1952), American artist
Josef Groll (1813–1887), Bavarian brewer, the "father of the pils"
Sarah Israelit Groll (1925–2007), Israeli Egyptologist

See also
Coenraad Liebrecht Temminck Groll, Dutch architect (1925–2015)